19th Route Army was an army in the Republic of China led by General Cai Tingkai.  It gained a good reputation among Chinese for fighting the Japanese in Shanghai in the January 28 Incident in 1932.  In 1933-34 it was the main force in the Fuijan Rebellion, which opposed Chiang Kai-shek and unsuccessfully sought an alliance with the Chinese Communists in the Jiangxi Soviet.

A "Route Army' was a type of military organization used in the Chinese Republic.  It usually exercised command over two or more Corps or a large number of Divisions or Independent Brigades.

Sources
First Battle of Shanghai
The Mausoleum of the 19th Route Army
Did Chiang Kai-shek Trigger the Fujian Rebellion?
The CCP and the Fujian Rebellion

See also
Second Sino-Japanese War
Fujian People's Government

Armies of the National Revolutionary Army
Conflicts in 1932
Shanghai 1932
Military history of Shanghai
1932 in China
1933 in China
Military history of the Republic of China (1912–1949)
Military history of Fujian